Matagarup Refugee Camp is a political protest against the Western Australian Government's threat to close many Aboriginal remote communities and safe space for Noongar homeless people. Matagarup is the Noongar name for Heirisson Island which is situated in the centre of Perth. On 1 March 2015 more than 100 Aboriginal protesters and homeless people established a "refugee protest" camp at Heirisson Island in response to the threat by State Government of forced closures of small remote communities. The City of Perth Shire has refused the right of the protesters to camp, protest and to shelter the homeless. The City of Perth raided the island camp nine times between March and August 2015, usually escorted by a large police presence, and confiscated the tents and belongings of the campers and the homeless. During some of the raids police have been accused of "an excessive use of force". Some of the raids have led to police arresting campers, handing out move-on notices and in court appearances but the campers and the homeless continue to return. On each occasion the camp has re-established itself, led by Nyungah Elder, Bella Bropho, who has camped on the island since 1 March 2015.

Bropho said that the homeless camp had to be fought for "because if this fails, I don't know where the people are going to go to."

The refugee camp is seen as both illegal and unwanted by ordinary Perth residents but claimed to be accepted by some workers with the homeless, particularly Jennifer Kaeshagen of the First Nations Homelessness Project and Tanya Cairns, director of HAND.

Matagarup Refugee Camp has attracted international attention and support.

On 31 May 2015, the Matagarup Concert for the Homeless was held on Heirisson Island despite the protestations of the City of Perth Shire. Social justice campaigner and homeless worker, Jennifer Kaeshagen coordinated the Concert.

The City of Perth Shire Chief Executive Officer Gary Stevenson stated "authorities were compelled to act due to the recent amount of activity on the island" and that "facilities are not designed to cope with large groups of people continuously congregating at Heirisson Island".

Matagarup has elevated media attention to Perth's increasing homelessness and advocates for the homeless such as Kaeshagen and Gerry Georgatos have established campaigns for Homeless Friendly Precincts and have even secured the support of the City of Perth Council. The campaign has expanded nationally. Georgatos said that homelessness on the streets includes significant numbers of large families "of 5,6,7,8, and 9 children".

Since the August 2015 raid, the City of Perth officially refers to this as "de-camping", in August 2015, the City of Perth desisted from confiscating the tents. The camp has grown and continues to shelter the homeless. Since August 2015, advocates alongside the campers led by Bella Bropho have brought the right of the homeless to camp at Heirisson Island before various tribunals, mediation and courts, each time unsuccessfully.

Kaeshagen and Cairns coordinated Christmas for the homeless camp at Heirisson on December 22, 2015 once again without securing permits from the City of Perth.

References

2010s in Perth, Western Australia
Protests in Australia